Pycnodontiformes is an extinct order of primarily marine bony fish. The group first appeared during the Late Triassic and disappeared during the Eocene. The group has been found in rock formations in Africa, Asia, Europe, North and South America. They were small to middle-sized fish, generally with laterally-compressed deep bodies, some with almost circular outlines, adapted for manuverability in reef-like environments, though the group was morphologically diverse. Most, but not all members of the groups had jaws with round and flattened teeth, well adapted to crush food items (durophagy), such as echinoderms, crustaceans and molluscs. Some pyncodontiformes developed piranha like teeth used for eating flesh. Most species inhabited shallow marine reef environments, while a handful of species lived in freshwater or brackish conditions. While rare during the Triassic and Early-Middle Jurassic, Pycnodontiformes became abundant and diverse during the Late Jurassic, exhibitng a high but relatively static diversity during the Early Cretaceous. At the beginning of the Late Cretaceous they reached their apex of morphological and species diversity (much of this due to fossils found in Lebanon, such as Gebrayelichthyidae and Ichthyoceros), after which they began to gradually decline, with a more sudden decline at the end of the Cretaceous due to the collapse of reef ecosystems, finally becoming extinct during the Eocene. They are considered to belong to the Neopterygii, but their relationship to other members of that group is uncertain.

Taxonomy

 Order Pycnodontiformes (Berg, 1937)
 Genus ?Acrorhinichthys Taverne & Capasso, 2015
 Genus ?Archaeopycnodon Sanchez & Benedetto, 1980
 Genus ?Athrodon le Sauvage 1880 non Osborn, 1887
 Genus ?Callodus Thurmond, 1974
 Genus ?Cosmodus le Sauvage, 1879 [Glossodus Costa, 1851 non Agassiz, 1828 ex Spix & Agassiz, 1829 non McCoy, 1848]
 Genus ?Ellipsodus Cornuel, 1877
 Genus ?Grypodon Hay, 1899 [Ancistrodon Dames, 1883 non De Beauvois, 1799 non Roemer, 1852 non Wagler, 1830]
 Genus ?Mercediella Koerber, 2012 [Camposichthys Figueiredo & Silva-Santos, 1991 non Travassos, 1946 non Whitley, 1953]
Genus ?Piranhamesodon Kölbl-Ebert et al., 2018
 Genus ?Pseudopycnodus Taverne, 2003
 Genus ?Tergestinia Capasso, 2000
 Genus ?Thurmondella Thurmond, 1974 non [Paramicrodon Thurmond, 1974 non de Meijere, 1913]
 Genus ?Uranoplosus le Sauvage, 1879
 Genus ?Woodthropea Swinnerton, 1925
Family ?Hadrodontidae Thurmond & Jones, 1981
 Genus Hadrodus Leidy, 1858 [Propenser Applegate, 1970]
Family ?Gebrayelichthyidae Nursall & Capasso, 2004
 Genus Gebrayelichthys Nursall & Capasso, 2004
 Genus Maraldichthys Taverne & Capasso, 2014
Family ?Gladiopycnodontidae Taverne & Capasso, 2013
 Genus Arduafrons Frickhinger, 1991
 Genus Eomesodon Woodward, 1918
 Genus Gladiopycnodus Taverne & Capasso, 2013
 Genus Joinvillichthys Taverne & Capasso, 2014
 Genus Micropycnodon Hibbard & Graffham, 1945 [Pycnomicrodon Hibbard & Graffham, 1941 non Hay, 1916]
 Genus Monocerichthys Taverne & Capasso, 2013
 Genus Pankowskichthys Taverne & Capasso, 2014
 Genus Paramesturus Taverne, 1981
 Genus Rostropycnodus Taverne & Capasso, 2013
 Genus Stenoprotome Hay, 1903
Family Mesturidae Nursall, 1996
 Genus Mesturus Wagner, 1862
Family Gyrodontidae Berg, 1940
 Genus Gyrodus Agassiz, 1833
Family Brembodontidae Tintori, 1981 [Brembodidae; Gibbodontidae Tintori, 1981]
 Genus Brembodus Tintori, 1981
 Genus Gibbodon Tintori, 1981
Family Coccodontidae Berg, 1940 [Trewavasiidae Nursall, 1996] 
 Genus Coccodus Pictet, 1850
 Genus Corusichthys Taverne & Capasso, 2014
 Genus Hensodon Kriwet, 2004
 Genus Ichthyoceros Gayet, 1984 
 Genus Paracoccodus Taverne & Capasso, 2014
 Genus Trewavasia White & Moy-Thomas, 1941 [Xenopholis Davis, 1887 non Peters, 1869; Xenopholoides Fowler, 1958] 
Family Pycnodontidae Agassiz, 1833 corrig. Bonaparte, 1845 [Nursalliidae Bloy, 1987; Sphaerodontidae Giebel, 1846; Palaeobalistidae Blot, 1987; Proscinetidae Gistel, 1848; Gyronchidae]
 Genus Abdobalistum Poyato-Ariza & Wenz, 2002
 Genus Anomiophthalmus Costa, 1856
 Genus Anomoedus Forir, 1887
 Genus Acrotemnus Agassiz 1836, 
 Genus Akromystax Poyato-Ariza & Wenz, 2005
 Genus Coelodus Heckel, 1854
 Genus Flagellipinna Cawley & Kriwet, 2019
 Genus Macropycnodon Shimada, Williamson & Sealey, 2010
 Genus Macromesodon Blake 1905 non Lehman, 1966 [Mesodon Wagner, 1851 non Rafinesque, 1821; Gyronchus Agassiz, 1839; Apomesodon Poyato-Ariza & Wenz, 2002]
 Genus Neoproseinetes De Figueiredo & Silva Santos, 1990
 Genus Nursallia Blot, 1987
 Genus Ocloedus Poyato-Ariza & Wenz, 2002
 Genus Oropycnodus Poyato-Ariza & Wenz, 2002
 Genus Palaeobalistum Taverne et al., 2015
 Genus Paranursallia Taverne et al., 2015
 Genus Phacodus Dixon, 1850 
 Genus Polazzodus Poyoto-Ariza, 2010
 Genus Polygyrodus White, 1927
 Genus Potiguara Machado & Brito, 2006
 Genus Proscinetes Gistl, 1848 [Microdon Agassiz, 1833 non Meigen, 1803 non Fritsch, 1876 non Conrad, 1842 non Gistl, 1848 non Dixon, 1850; Polypsephis Hay, 1899]
 Genus Pycnomicrodon Hay 1916 non Hibbard & Graffham, 1941
 Genus Pycnodus Agassiz, 1833
 Genus Rhinopycnodus Taverne & Capasso, 2013
 Genus Sphaerodus Agassiz, 1833
 Genus Sphaeronchus Stinton & Torrens, 1967
 Genus Stenamara Poyato-Ariza & Wenz, 2000
 Genus Stemmatias Hay, 1899 [Stemmatodus St. John & Worthen, 1875 non Heckel, 1854 non]
 Genus Stemmatodus Heckel, 1854 non St. John & Worthen, 1875 non
 Genus Sylvienodus Poyato-Ariza & Wenz, 2013
 Genus Tamanja Wenz, 1989
 Genus Tepexichtys Applegate, 1992
 Genus Tibetodus Young & Liu, 1954
 Genus Turbomesodon Poyato-Ariza & Wenz, 2004 [Macromesodon Lehman, 1966 non Blake, 1905]
 Genus Typodus Quenstedt, 1858
 Genus Abdobalistum Poyato-Ariza & Wenz, 2002
Family incertae sedis
 Genus Agassizilia Cooper and Martill, 2020
 Genus Neomesturus Cooper and Martill, 2020

References

 Capasso, Luigi  (2021). "Pycnodonts: An overwiew and new insights in the Pycnodontomorpha Nursall, 2010". Occasional Paper of the University Museum of Chieti, Monographic Publication, 1: 1-223.

 
Prehistoric ray-finned fish orders